Winfried Schmidt  (28 February 1915 – 3 August 2009) was a German flying ace of World War II.

Military career
Schmidt claimed his first aerial victory on 18 December 1939 during the Battle of the Heligoland Bight. He was credited with shooting down a Vickers Wellington bomber near Langeoog.

On 23 June 1941, Schmidt was appointed Staffelkapitän (squadron leader) of 8. Staffel of Jagdgeschwader 3 (JG 3—3rd Fighter Wing). He succeeded Oberleutnant Willy Stange who was killed in action the day before, the first day of Operation Barbarossa, the German invasion of the Soviet Union. On 11 July, Schmidt was severely wounded in combat near Fastiv. Schmidt had been hit in the lung by the defensive fire of a Tupolev SB tail gunner. His wingman Leutnant Wilhelm Lemke managed to guide him back to the airfield at Polonne. There, he crashed his Messerschmitt Bf 109 F-2 (Werknummer 8236—factory number). The next day, Schmidt was replaced by Oberleutnant Franz Beyer as commander of 8. Staffel.

Summary of career

Aerial victory claims
Mathews and Foreman, authors of Luftwaffe Aces – Biographies and Victory Claims, researched the German Federal Archives and found records for 19 aerial victory claims. This figure includes 14 aerial victories on the Eastern Front and four on the Western Front.

Awards
 Knight's Cross of the Iron Cross as Oberleutnant and Staffelkapitän of the 8./Jagdgeschwader 3

Notes

References

Citations

Bibliography

 
 
 
 
 
 
 
 

 
 

1915 births
2009 deaths
Luftwaffe pilots
German World War II flying aces
Military personnel from Cologne
Recipients of the Knight's Cross of the Iron Cross